Vittoriano Drovandi (27 April 1941 - 2 July 2013) was an Italian high jumper and athletics coach.

Career
Three-time national champion at senior level in high jump from 1964 to 1967, boasts 9 caps in the Italy national athletics team.

In his hometown, Livorno, a high jump meeting is named after him, which has been held annually since 2014.

National titles
Drovandi won three national championships at individual senior level.

Italian Athletics Championships
High jump: 1964, 1965, 1967

References

External links
 Vittoriano Drovandi at CONI

1941 births
2013 deaths
Italian athletics coaches
Italian male high jumpers
Athletics competitors of Centro Sportivo Carabinieri